Oheb Shalom Congregation (Hebrew: Lovers of Peace) is an egalitarian, inclusive, diverse and multi-generational community that embraces Jewish tradition in the 21st Century. It is located in South Orange, New Jersey.Founded on Prince Street in Newark, the congregation's members have lived in and served Essex County and the broader community for over 160 years.

Effective July, 2021, Oheb Shalom hired Rabbi Abigail Treu and Cantor Eliana Kissner to collaborate with the lay leadership to build towards the future. 

The congregation was founded in September 1860 by a group of Bohemian Jews.

Its 1884 Moorish Revival building, known as the Prince Street Synagogue, is listed on the New Jersey Register of Historic Places.In 1911, the congregation moved to High Street (later renamed Dr. MLK, Jr. Blvd.) and subsequently relocated to Scotland Road in South Orange in 1958.

References

External links
Oheb Shalom Congregation Official Website
Oheb Shalom Cemetery Official Website

Ashkenazi Jewish culture in New Jersey
Czech-Jewish culture in the United States
Moorish Revival architecture in New Jersey
Conservative synagogues in New Jersey
South Orange, New Jersey
Religious buildings and structures in Essex County, New Jersey
1860 establishments in New Jersey